Mary Elizabeth Hill (born November 8, 1985) is a former freestyle swimmer from the United States, who won the gold medal in the women's 400-metre freestyle event at the 2003 Pan American Games.

A native of Atlanta, Georgia, she also won gold in the 800-metre free relay at the 2005 Summer Universiade, and finished fifth in the 200-metre freestyle and seventh in the 200-metre butterfly.  In 2005 Hill also took seventh in the 200-metre butterfly and eighth in the 200-metre freestyle at the U.S. World Championship Trials.

See also

 List of University of Georgia people

References

1985 births
Living people
American female freestyle swimmers
Georgia Bulldogs women's swimmers
Swimmers at the 2003 Pan American Games
Swimmers from Atlanta
Pan American Games gold medalists for the United States
Pan American Games medalists in swimming
Universiade medalists in swimming
Universiade gold medalists for the United States
Medalists at the 2005 Summer Universiade
Medalists at the 2003 Pan American Games